Kʼan Ahk II, also known as Ruler B was the second ruler of that Mayan city in Guatemala. He was a successor of Ruler A. He reigned c. 478.

Nothing is known of this king except that one of his lieutenants, a yajawte' ("lord of the tree"), was captured by Yaxchilan ruler Bird Jaguar II, probably in AD 478, as recorded at Yaxchilan.

His successor was Turtle Tooth.

Notes

Kings of Piedras Negras
5th century in the Maya civilization
5th-century monarchs in North America